Mantralaya may refer to:

Mantralayam, Andhra Pradesh, India, a major center of pilgrimage for Hindus belonging to the Madhva sect
Mantralaya, Mumbai, administrative headquarters of Maharashtra in South Mumbai, built in 1955